A Modern Day Prodigal Son is the debut studio album from American country rock singer Brantley Gilbert. It was first self-released on a limited scale with just the first eleven songs back in 2005.  It finally was released nationally by Average Joes in October 2009 (and later re-released by Valory Music Co.).  Although it produced no singles, the song "My Kinda Party" became Jason Aldean's leadoff single to his album of the same name in late 2010. Aldean also covered "The Best of Me" on his third studio album, Wide Open. The album itself charted on Top Country Albums and the Billboard 200.

Track listing

Chart performance

References

2009 debut albums
Average Joes Entertainment albums
Brantley Gilbert albums